Down and Out is a 1977 short film created by Aardman Animations. It is part of the Animated Conversations series. In this short, creators David Sproxton and Peter Lord "applied the groundbreaking technique of using recorded conversations of real people as the basis for the script".

History
David Sproxton said "That was the first film of five minutes we had ever made and the first we had ever done using found sound, produced by a big producer called Colin Thomas. We sent [ex-BBC producer Jeremy Isaacs] the small amount of work we had, which was basically Down and Out and some kids' stuff. And he called us up to the London office...and said 'I've seen that film Down and Out. We'd like ten of those for our first week's transmission.'" These were the 5 shorts of Conversation Pieces, and later the five short of the Lip Synch series.

According to Aardman Animation,

Production
This was the first film to use the technique developed by Sproxton and Lordan of "animating puppet characters to spontaneous, realistic conversations, rather than prepared scripts...It impressed producer Jeremy Isaacs, who commissioned five five-minute films [entitled Conversation Pieces] for the newly established Channel 4 in London. Animated Documentary explains "Confessions of a Foyer Girl and Down and Out were based on eavesdropped conversations and pair documentary sound with stop motion animation of Plasticine figures.

References

External links
 Full movie posted by Aardman's official channel on youtube

1978 films
British animated short films
1970s English-language films
1970s British films